I Riigikogu was the first legislature of the Estonian Parliament (Riigikogu). The legislature was elected after 1920 elections (held on 27–29 November 1920). It sat between 20 December 1920 and 30 May 1923, before the next round of elections were held.

Parties and seats 
The 1920 general election distributed the 100 seats as follows:

Officials 
Chairmen:
 Otto Strandman  (4 January 1921 to 18 November 1921)
 Johann Kukk (18 November 1921 to 20 November 1922)
 Konstantin Päts (from 20 November 1922)
First Assistant Chairman:
 Karl Virma (from 4 January 1921)
Second Assistant Chairmen:
 Jaan Järve (4 January 1921 to 4 March 1921)
 August Kerem (from 4 March 1921)
Secretaries:
 Artur Tupits  (4 January 1921 to 20 November 1922)
 Tõnis Kalbus (from 20 November 1922)
First Assistant Secretary
 Jaan-Johann Bergmann (from 4 January 1921)
Second Assistant Secretary
 Walter von Pezold (from 4 January 1921)

Members of the Riigikogu

References

Riigikogu